Sammy K. Obeid (1984) is an American writer and stand-up comedian. He has released one comedy album, Get Funny or Die Tryin. The New York Times described his comedy as displaying "an analytic style full of wordplay, clever misdirection and ethnic humor riffing on his Middle Eastern roots". Obeid is Palestinian-American.

Obeid has been featured on America's Got Talent, Conan and Last Comic Standing. He once performed 1,001 nights of comedy in a row, which he claimed as a world record, although it was not recognized by Guinness. Obeid is also a host for the Netflix show 100 Humans and the founder of KO Comedy.

References

21st-century American comedians
American stand-up comedians
American comedy writers
American comedians of Arab descent
American people of Lebanese descent
American people of Palestinian descent
Year of birth missing (living people)
Living people